Gavilan College is a public community college in Santa Clara County, California.

History

The college was established in 1919 as the San Benito County Junior College. It operated as such until 1963, when a new community college district was drawn that included both San Benito County and southern Santa Clara County. The college moved to its present main campus in 1968.

Campus
The main campus is in Gilroy, California. In 1997, satellite sites were added in Hollister and Morgan Hill to augment offerings on the main campus. In 2008, land was purchased in Coyote Valley and San Benito County for the future development of additional campuses. In 2017, Phase 1 of the Coyote Valley Center was completed, becoming Gavilan's newest instructional site and the home for South Bay Public Safety Training Consortium police and fire academies.

Academics
Gavilan College offers Associate of Arts and Associate of Science degrees, and certificates in a variety of career fields.  Gavilan College is also the only community college in northern California offering degree and certificate programs in Aviation Maintenance Technology.

Gilroy Early College Academy

Gavilan College hosts an early college high school, Dr. TJ Owens Gilroy Early College Academy (GECA), ranked as one of the best high schools in California and the United States as a whole. Founded in 2007, GECA students are able to complete two years of college in their four years of high school by taking advanced placement and honors classes, as well as Gavilan College courses alongside Gavilan students, and can graduate with up to 60 transferable units.

Student life
Fine and performing arts opportunities include theater, children's theater, gallery art, mural art, ceramics, Folklorico dance, choir, instrumental ensemble, symphony, and vocal ensemble.

Sports
Athletics teams include men's football, baseball, basketball, and soccer, and women's basketball, softball, volleyball and beach volleyball. The Gavilan College mascot are the rams.

Student diversity
African American: 3%
Asian American: 7%
Hispanic: 43%
International: 0%
Native American: 1%
White: 36%
Unknown: 9%

Notable alumni

Athletes
 Jeff Garcia, former quarterback for the San Francisco 49'ers
 Frank LaCorte, former pitcher for the Atlanta Braves and the Houston Astros
 Louis A. Mackey, former linebacker for the Dallas Cowboys
 Bob Kampa, former lineman for the Denver Broncos
 Josh Wallwork, former quarterback for the Wyoming Cowboys

Politicians
 Luis Alejo, former California State Assemblyman and Mayor of Watsonville

References

External links

Official website

 
California Community Colleges
Educational institutions established in 1919
Schools accredited by the Western Association of Schools and Colleges
Universities and colleges in Santa Clara County, California
Gilroy, California
Two-year colleges in the United States
1919 establishments in California